Mansions on the Moon was an American band from Los Angeles, California.

History
The group was formed by Ted Wendler on guitar and vocals, Ben Hazlegrove on keyboards, and Lane Shaw on drums. Both Shaw and Hazlegrove were also members of Pnuma Trio.

In 2010, the group released the debut mixtape, Paradise Falls, presented by Diplo and DJ Benzi. Hypetrak called the group one of the "most interesting recording artists to have emerged this year." Paradise Falls includes collaborations with Xaphoon Jones (of Chiddy Bang) and Big Gigantic, among others. Pharrell Williams served as executive producer on the group's 2012 EP, Lightyears.

The group has produced official remixes for Foster the People and Zee Avi, and produced the Mac Miller track "PA Nights" on the album Blue Slide Park. In 2011, the group joined Wiz Khalifa and Mac Miller on the Green Carpet Tour. In 2012, the group played South by Southwest and the Lightyears Tour, and charted on Billboards Next Big Sound.

In 2013, the group released the Full Moon EP. It featured collaborations with Zee Avi, Codi Caraco, and Paper Diamond. The group's Full Moon EP was followed up in 2014 by the self-titled album, Mansions on the Moon. According to bassist, Jeff Maccora, many of the songs on the album were inspired by the group's move to Los Angeles.

The group disbanded in 2017. Frontman Ted Wendler is pursuing a solo career under the name Ted When.

Members
Current members
 Ted Wendler - guitar, keyboards, vocals
 Lane Shaw - drums
 Jeff Maccora - bass guitar, keyboards

Former members
 Ben Hazlegrove - keyboards, vocals

Discography

Studio albums
 Mansions on the Moon (2014)

Mixtapes
 Paradise Falls (2010)

EPs
 Lightyears (2012)
 Full Moon (2013)
 Lost and Found (2013)

Singles
 "Don't Tell (Ryan Lofty Remix)" (2015)

Remixes
 Foster the People - "Life on the Nickel (Mansions on the Moon Remix)" (2011)
 Zee Avi - "Concrete Wall (Mansions on the Moon Remix)" (2012)

Guest appearances
 Fred Falke - "It's a Memory" (2016)

References

External links
 
 

American synth-pop groups
Alternative hip hop groups
Electronic music groups from California
American electronic rock musical groups
Indie rock musical groups from California
Musical groups established in 2011
Musical groups from Los Angeles
Musical quartets
2011 establishments in California